Hauraki District is a territorial authority within the Hauraki region of New Zealand. The seat of the council is at Paeroa.

The area covered by the district extends from the southwest coast of the Firth of Thames southeast towards Te Aroha, although that town lies beyond its boundaries. It extends eastwards to the Bay of Plenty coast, taking in the southernmost part of the Coromandel Peninsula. The rest of the peninsula is part of Thames-Coromandel District.

Features of the district include the Karangahake Gorge, Whiritoa, the Hauraki Plains, Ngatea and the gold mining town of Waihi.

Demographics

Hauraki District had a population of 20,022 at the 2018 New Zealand census, an increase of 2,214 people (12.4%) since the 2013 census, and an increase of 2,166 people (12.1%) since the 2006 census. There were 7,869 households, comprising 9,885 males and 10,137 females, giving a sex ratio of 0.98 males per female. The median age was 46.8 years (compared with 37.4 years nationally), with 3,741 people (18.7%) aged under 15 years, 2,958 (14.8%) aged 15 to 29, 8,595 (42.9%) aged 30 to 64, and 4,728 (23.6%) aged 65 or older.

Ethnicities were 84.1% European/Pākehā, 22.9% Māori, 3.0% Pacific peoples, 3.6% Asian, and 1.5% other ethnicities. People may identify with more than one ethnicity.

The percentage of people born overseas was 13.1, compared with 27.1% nationally.

Although some people chose not to answer the census's question about religious affiliation, 54.9% had no religion, 31.4% were Christian, 1.8% had Māori religious beliefs, 0.4% were Hindu, 0.1% were Muslim, 0.5% were Buddhist and 2.1% had other religions.

Of those at least 15 years old, 1,629 (10.0%) people had a bachelor's or higher degree, and 4,551 (28.0%) people had no formal qualifications. The median income was $24,600, compared with $31,800 nationally. 1,638 people (10.1%) earned over $70,000 compared to 17.2% nationally. The employment status of those at least 15 was that 6,708 (41.2%) people were employed full-time, 2,532 (15.6%) were part-time, and 660 (4.1%) were unemployed.

Local government
In 2010, the neighbouring Franklin District was abolished during the creation of the Auckland Council, and a stretch of the southwest coast of the Firth of Thames, around Kaiaua, was added to the Hauraki District.

The current mayor is Toby Adams. Adams was re-elected unopposed in 2022 to serve a further three year term.

Populated places
Hauraki District consists of the following towns, localities, settlements and communities:

 Paeroa Ward:
 Awaiti
 Hikutaia South1
 Karangahake
 Komata North
 Komata Reefs
 Komata
 Mackaytown
 Maratoto
 Netherton
 Paeroa
 Te Moananui
 Tirohia

 Plains Ward:
 Horahia
 Kaiaua2
 Kaihere
 Kerepehi
 Kopuarahi
 Miranda2, 3
 Ngatea
 Orongo
 Patetonga
 Pipiroa
 Torehape
 Turua
 Waharau2
 Waitakaruru
 Whakatīwai2

 Waihi Ward:
 Golden Cross
 Golden Valley
 Waiharakeke
 Waihi
 Waikino
 Waimata
 Waitawheta
 Waitekauri
 Whiritoa

Notes:
1 - partly shared with Thames-Coromandel District
2 - formerly part of the defunct Franklin District
3 - also known as Pukorokoro

References

External links

 The council's site
 The council's public library's site

 
Waikato